The Tedim or Zomi language is spoken mostly in Myanmar and India. In Chin State (Khamtunggam), it is spoken in Tedim and Tonzang townships, while in Sagaing Division, it is spoken in Kalay and Mawlaik townships (Ethnologue). Dialects are Sokte and Kamhau (also called Kamhao, Kamhow).

Clans
Sukte is a small Zomi clan. They generally live in the Tedim and Tonzang townships. "But there is no specific native language of Sukte. It is just a clan of Zomi." Zam Ngaih Cing (2011:170) lists some Zomi varieties as Losau, Sihzang, Teizang, Saizang, Dim, Khuano, Hualngo, Dim, Zou, Thado, Paite and Vangteh.

History
Zomi language was the primary language spoken by Pau Cin Hau, a religious leader who lived from 1859 to 1948. He also devised a logographic and later simplified alphabetic script for writing materials in Zomi language.

Phonology
The phonology of Zomi language can be described as (C)V(V)(C)T order, where C represents a consonant, V represents a vowel, T represents a tone, and parentheses enclose optional constituents of a syllable. It is a subject-object verb language, and negation follows the verb.

Consonants 

 Approximants [j, w] can be heard as allophones of vowels /i̯, u̯/ within diphthongs.
 /x/ can also be heard as an aspirated velar stop [kʰ] in free variation.

Vowels 

 Sounds /ɛ, ɔ/ may have short allophones of more close [e, o].

Tone

References

Kuki-Chin languages
Languages of Mizoram
Languages of Manipur